Luštica is a village in the municipality of Herceg Novi, Montenegro. It is located in the eponymous peninsula, on the shores of the Adriatic Sea. The settlement consists of hamlets of Rose, Klinci, Mrkovi, Zabrđe, Radovanovići, Brguli and Mardari.

Demographics
According to 2003 census, it had a population of 338.

According to the 2011 census, its population was 311.

References

Populated places in Herceg Novi Municipality
Coastal towns in Montenegro
Serb communities in Montenegro